Arcanobacterium phocae is a bacterial species. It is pathogenic for some sea mammals.

References

External links
LPSN
Type strain of Arcanobacterium phocae at BacDive -  the Bacterial Diversity Metadatabase

Actinomycetales
Bacteria described in 1997